The River Deben is a river in Suffolk rising to the west of Debenham, though a second, higher source runs south from the parish of Bedingfield. The river passes through Woodbridge, turning into a tidal estuary before entering the North Sea at Felixstowe Ferry. The mouth of the estuary is crossed by a ferry connecting Felixstowe and Bawdsey.

History
Both the river-name and the name of the village of Debenham are of uncertain origin and relationship, but one theory (of several on offer) is that the river's name was originally Dēope meaning 'the deep one'. The river-name, however, is not recorded in the form Deben before 1735, when it appears thus in Kirby's Suffolk Traveller.  The river, though still little more than a stream, is forded twice in the village, with one ford claimed to be among the longest in England.

Tide mills at Woodbridge have operated off the tide from the river Deben since at least 1170.  The present mill, built in 1793, is producing stone ground wholemeal flour in the traditional way.

Ecology

The Deben Estuary is a Special Protection Area and Ramsar Site and within the Suffolk Coast and Heaths Area of Outstanding Natural Beauty. Its significance arises from its over-wintering population of avocets (Recurvirostra avosetta). The estuary features shifting sandbanks. Plant life is dominated by the common reed (Phragmites australis). The salt marsh and intertidal mud-flats that occupy most of the area have the widest range of salt marsh flora in Suffolk.

Leisure

There are several yacht and dinghy clubs on the river Deben. These include the Deben Rowing Club, Deben Yacht Club, the Waldringfield Sailing Club, Felixstowe Ferry Sailing Club and the Woodbridge Cruising Club.  There are two yacht harbours, the Tidemill Yacht Harbour, close to the Tide Mill; and the Granary Yacht Harbour, further upstream at Melton.
The river Deben is a popular location for many other water sports including canoeing, wakeboarding, paddle boarding and windsurfing. The area where the river Deben enters the North Sea at Felixstowe Ferry is also a popular location for the sport of kitesurfing. Kitesurfers can usually be seen around low tide when the wind conditions are favourable, ranging from NE round to SW and depending on the direction of the tide.

Peninsula 
The Deben Peninsula is a region of Suffolk, made up of the area of the Coast and Heaths AONB between the River Deben to the south and the Alde and Ore Estuary in the north. The area is relatively remote, and noted for its stunning coastline.

See also
 Bawdsey Ferry
 River Alde
 Suffolk Coast and Heaths

References

External links

 River Deben Navigation Information
 SPA designation
 Deben Yacht Club
 

Rivers of Suffolk
Ramsar sites in England
Special Protection Areas in England